Ernest Whitworth Marland, known as E. W. Marland (May 8, 1874 – October 3, 1941), was an American lawyer, oil businessman in Pennsylvania and Oklahoma, and politician who was a U.S. representative and Oklahoma governor. He served in the United States House of Representatives from northern Oklahoma, 1933 to 1935 and as the tenth governor of Oklahoma from 1935 to 1939. As a Democrat, he initiated a "Little Deal" in Oklahoma during the Great Depression, working to relieve the distress of unemployed people in the state, and to build infrastructure as investment for the future.

Marland made fortunes in oil in Pennsylvania in the 1900s and in Oklahoma in the 1920s, and lost each in the volatility of the industry and the times. At the height of his wealth in the 1920s, Marland built a mansion known as the Palace of the Prairies in Ponca City, after introducing fox hunts (and red foxes) and polo games to the local elite society. It has been designated a National Historic Landmark. The Marland-Paris Mansion, his former home on Grand Avenue, is listed on the National Register of Historic Places.

Marland and his first wife Virginia did not have any children. To share their wealth and help her sister Margaret Roberts and her family, in 1916 they adopted their two children, George and Lydie, who were then 19 and 16 years old. The Marlands sent them to private school and gave them other advantages. Two years after Virginia's death in 1926, Marland had Lydie's adoption annulled. He married Lydie Roberts that year, and she later accompanied him to Washington, D.C., and the governor's mansion.

Early life and education 
Ernest Whitworth Marland was born in Pittsburgh, Pennsylvania on May 8, 1874. His father was a mill owner in Pittsburgh who boasted in his later years that he never had a strike in his mill and his workers remembered him as having been "always fair to labor". This gave the son his belief in capitalism and his understanding of the importance of good labor relations.

Marland was educated in private schools, he did collegiate and law studies on an accelerated schedule, earning his LL.B. from the University of Michigan Law School at the age of 19 in 1893.

Marriage and family
Unlike many men of the period, Marland waited to marry until he was well-established. He first married Mary Virginia Collins, known as Virginia, on November 5, 1903, in Philadelphia, Pennsylvania. By 1907 he had become a millionaire from his oil dealings in Pennsylvania, but lost a fortune in a downturn. They decided to move to Oklahoma, where they found renewed success in its oil boom. They had no children of their own.

In 1916, to help her sister Margaret Roberts and her husband George and to share their wealth, they adopted the Roberts' two children: George and Lydie, then 19 and 16, respectively. They sent them to private schools and gave them other opportunities. The Marlands were together until Virginia's death on June 6, 1926, in Ponca City, Kay County, Oklahoma from pneumonia.
	
Two years later, E. W. Marland had Lydie Roberts Marland's adoption annulled. On July 14, 1928, he married Lydie Roberts in Philadelphia. She was 28 and he was 54. They were together until his death on October 3, 1941.

Career
After law school, Marland returned to Pittsburgh where he started a private practice. Through his experiences as an attorney, he became interested in geology and entered the developing oil industry in Pennsylvania. He invested in new wells and companies and, by the age of 33, Marland had become a self-made millionaire.

That same year, Marland lost millions in the panic of 1907. By 1908, Marland was broke and without a job. Hoping to start their lives over, Marland and Virginia moved to the new state of Oklahoma. They settled in Ponca City, where he resumed his oil career.

He first founded the 101 Ranch Oil Company. Marland was successful in reestablishing his fortune and, by 1920, it was estimated at $85,000,000 (roughly $910,000,000 in modern dollars).
That year he founded the Marland Oil Company in Ponca City (it was incorporated in Delaware on October 8, 1920) and served as its president. In 1928, the Marland Oil Company was taken over in a hostile bid process by J. P. Morgan, Jr. and was merged with Continental Oil and Transportation Company (CONOCO). Marland's oil empire was destroyed and he was pushed out of the company and replaced as President of Marland Oil by Dan Moran. He lost all of his wealth for the second time. He and William Skelly were instrumental in the founding of the Kansas-Oklahoma division of the United States Oil and Gas Association, then known as "Mid-Continent Oil and Gas Association".

Congressman
Despite his big business background, Marland was not a Republican. His treatment at the hands of Morgan and other eastern monopoly giants gave him a distrust of them, leading him to register as a Democrat. Marland supported Franklin D. Roosevelt's New Deal programs from the beginning of his presidency. Through association with FDR, Marland was elected in 1932 to the United States House of Representatives to represent Oklahoma's 8th congressional district, since disbanded. Marland was the first Democrat to hold that seat in 15 years.

Marland served in Congress for a single term, from 1933 to 1935. He declined reelection after entering the Democratic primaries to succeed Governor William H. Murray. Marland won both the Democratic nomination and the election in November 1934 to serve as the tenth governor of the state.

Governor of Oklahoma

On January 15, 1935, Marland was inaugurated as governor. Several years before, the widower had married Lydie Roberts Marland, his former adopted daughter. She was then 28 and he was 54. She became First Lady of the state.

Marland quickly instituted a program that would become known as the "Little New Deal". From the start, the Oklahoma House and Oklahoma Senate were not in favor of his plans. The legislature was more concerned with reducing the state's massive deficit (roughly a quarter of billion dollars in modern currency). Marland, an avid supporter of FDR, stressed the need for the state government to work with the federal government in creating jobs and support for families.

Despite Marland's efforts, most Oklahoman politicians never fully embraced the New Deal. What the Legislature would accept was a homestead exemption provision to the state's ad valorem taxes, increased school funds, and raising the state sales tax to two percent. Marland introduced legislation to appropriate funds raised by the sales tax for aid to the handicapped, the elderly, and dependent children.

At this time, Oklahoma had an estimated 150,000 Oklahomans that were unemployed and 700,000 on relief. Marland asked the Fifteenth Legislature for a board to craft policy to develop the physical infrastructure of the state with investments to create a more diverse economy. The Legislature responded with the 15-member State Planning and Resources Board. The Board worked with FDR's Works Progress Administration to create jobs through public works projects such as construction of dams and tree planting. The State Highway Department expanded its road work and created thousands of jobs. Historic properties and renovated, archeological excavations were undertaken to identify and preserve resources, and other resources were enhanced.

Though he did not balance the state's budget, Marland created the Oklahoma Highway Patrol and the Interstate Oil Compact. Through the Compact, six oil-producing states agreed to practice oil conservation and establish a fair price for petroleum. The governing body of the Compact was a commission, of which Marland was elected to serve as the first president.

Marland's term as governor ended on January 9, 1939. Through more than 1,300 WPA projects, he had created jobs for more than 90,000 Oklahomans. After his term, he returned to Ponca City and tried to recreate the Marland Oil Company .

In 1940, Marland ran for the United States House of Representatives again but was unsuccessful against a Republican candidate.

Pioneer Woman statue

In the early 1920s while enjoying his great oil wealth, Marland decided to commission a statue, the Pioneer Woman, for installation in Ponca City. Marland was asked, "E. W., why don't you have sculptor Jo Davidson make a statue to the vanishing American, a Ponca, Otoe, or an Osage – a monument of great size?" Marland answered, "The Indian is not the vanishing American – it's the pioneer woman."

Marland commissioned twelve miniature  sculptures by US and international sculptors as models for the Pioneer Woman statue. Marland paid each sculptor a commission for these models, which has been variously cited as $10,000 and as $2,000 for each submission. The miniatures were shipped for exhibit in twelve cities, where they were viewed by a total of 750,000 people. Marland invited them to cast votes for their favorite but said he would make the final selection.

The twelve submissions included Confident by Bryant Baker; Self-Reliant by Alexander Stirling Calder;  Trusting by Jo Davidson; Affectionate by James E. Fraser; Protective by John Gregory; Adventurous by F. Lynn Jenkins; Heroic by Mario Korbel; Faithful by Arthur Lee; Challenging by Hermon Atkins MacNeil; Determined by Maurice Sterne; Fearless by Wheeler Williams; and Sturdy by Mahonri Young. The New York Times reported on March 27, 1927, that the exhibition had arrived in New York City and that it had attracted "more interest than any exhibition of sculpture New York has known in a long while." After being exhibited for three weeks in the Reinhardt Galleries, Bryant Baker's model won first place in the New York balloting. The Times reported that "Baker not only won first honors, but was the last man to enter the contest having no more than a month to prepare his model and obtain a casting."

I believe all of the sculptors have done well. We could select any one of the twelve figures and get an excellent interpretation of the frontier woman. The decision will be a hard one to make. I expect to be guided largely by public taste, but the final decision will be my own. This national vote is going to show exactly what the American people think about one of the greatest of their women.

The exhibition touched a popular chord in American culture of the time. The New York Times reported on March 27, 1927, that among the visitors was 91‑year‑old Betty Wollman, who as a young bride had journeyed from St. Louis, Missouri, to Leavenworth, Kansas, in 1855. She had once entertained Abraham Lincoln as a dinner guest in the Wollman household, long before he was a candidate for president. Wollman spoke about women's role during pioneer days in the Old West and congratulated Marland for his proposal to erect a statue in her honor.

The winning statue nationwide was Confident, which featured a woman and her son, by the British-born American sculptor Bryant Baker. Marland's personal favorite was said to be Trusting by Jo Davidson, who had already sculpted statues of Marland and his adopted children: George and Lydie.

On April 22, 1930, at a reception for 40,000 guests, Baker's sculpture was unveiled in Ponca City in a public ceremony. Guest speaker Will Rogers paid tribute to Oklahoma's pioneers. President Herbert Hoover addressed the nation in a radio broadcast to commemorate the statue. He said, "It was those women who carried the refinement, the moral character and spiritual force into the West.

Death
Marland died of a heart condition on October 3, 1941, at the age of 67. He is buried in Ponca City.

Movie about Marland

Filmmaker Scott Swearingen made a documentary about the oilman, High Stakes: The Life and Times of E.W. Marland (2016), which he co-produced with Steve Herrin. Supported with funding by the Marland Foundation, the film was featured with a panel discussion at the Oklahoma Historical Society on September 13, 2016.
In August 2012, the Weinstein Company, announced that it was to produce the romantic drama film Ends of the Earth, written by Academy Award-winning screenwriter Chris Terrio, and based on the lives of EW and Lydie Marland. The screenplay was said to explore the controversial love affair between the oil baron and former Oklahoma governor, and his adopted daughter, who built a mansion and other extravagances in Ponca City, Oklahoma. Actress Jennifer Lawrence was cast in the role of Lydie Marland. The screenplay went through several rewrites and the film may still be in development.

Commemoration

His Italianate mansion in Ponca City, the 55-room E. W. Marland Mansion designed by John Duncan Forsyth, was declared a National Historic Landmark in 1977.
His previous home, known as the Marland Grand Home, located on Grand Avenue with eight acres of formal gardens, is listed on the National Register of Historic Places.

State of the State speeches
First State of the State Speech
Second State of the State Speech
Third State of the State Speech
Fourth State of the State Speech

Citations

External links
History of E.W. Marland, Marland Mansion Website
Ernest Marland, Oklahoma State
"Pioneer Woman Models", Hugh Pickens website

Democratic Party governors of Oklahoma
American businesspeople in the oil industry
Petroleum in Oklahoma
1874 births
1941 deaths
Democratic Party members of the United States House of Representatives from Oklahoma
Pennsylvania lawyers
People from Ponca City, Oklahoma
Politicians from Pittsburgh
American Episcopalians
ConocoPhillips people
University of Michigan Law School alumni